Jannatabad (also Romanized as Jannatābād and Jenatābād) is a village in Arzuiyeh Rural District, in the Central District of Arzuiyeh County, Kerman Province, Iran. At the 2006 census, its population was 345, in 80 families.

References 

Populated places in Arzuiyeh County